All Is Well (in Portuguese Por aqui tudo bem, ; in French Tout Va Bien) is a 2011 film by Angolan filmmaker Pocas Pascoal. It was shown at the Malta Film Festival and Germany's Africa Alive Festival's 2014 edition. The film has a duration time of 94 minutes.

Plot
The film deals with a pair of young, teen-aged sisters, the sixteen years old Aida and the seventeen years old Maria, escaping Angola to live in Lisbon, Portugal during 1980, in order to escape the Angolan civil war of that era.

The pair make it to Lisbon, where life proves to be harsh for the two African women. They have a hard time adapting to their new country and its customs and culture, but then a tragic event changes their lives once again.

Cast
Ciomara Morais as Alda
Cheila Lima as Maria
Willion Brandão as Carlos
Vera Cruz as Alice

Reception
All Is Well received mixed reviews from critics. Oscar Moralde of Slant Magazine praised Pascoal's depiction of the challenges of Angolan refugees and its impact on the bond between Alda and Maria. Moralde also praised the characterization of Alda and Maria themselves, writing that "Pascoal is steadfast in presenting Alda and Maria as people, not symbols". Robert Koehler's review for Variety was more critical, stating that the cast "lack[ed] a sense of character nuance" and criticizing the dialogue and filmography as unimpressive. Justin Lowe of The Hollywood Reporter wrote that while Pascoal accurately captured the difficulties of refugees, "the film's near-relentless negativity becomes wearying".

Awards
The film won many international awards,  including the:
Los Angeles Film Festival, United States, 2012
Khourigba African Film Festival, Morocco, 2012
Karthage Afternoon Films Festival, Tunisia, 2012
Festival Internacional de Luanda, Angola, 2012
Fespaco de Uagadugu, Burkina Faso, 2013
Festival Indie Lisboa, Portugal, 2013

References

External links

2011 films
Angolan drama films
Angolan Civil War in fiction
Films set in Lisbon
Films about refugees